Abiegos is one of nine Parroquias in the municipality Ponga in the autonomous Region Asturia in Spain. The 34 residents (2007) live in a village close to the Nature Park Ponga. The administrative centre of the municipality San Juan de Beleño is 5.5 km away.

Sights 
 Hórreo de los Beyos
 Church „Iglesia de San Lorenzo“ in Abiegos
 Chapel „Capilla de San Antonio“
 Chapel „Capilla de la Merreguera“
 Hermitage „Ermita de Arcenorio“

Villages and hamlets in Parroquia 
 Abiegos - 34 residents 2007

References 
Population figures see  INE
Postcodes see 
Coordinates and altitudes see Google Earth

External links 
 Information page in the tourism portal "vivirasturias"
Map of Asturia

Parishes in Ponga